
De Moerbei is a restaurant in Warmond, Netherlands. It is a fine dining restaurant that was awarded one Michelin star for the period 2009-present. The restaurant held a Bib Gourmand in the period 2000–2003.

GaultMillau awarded the restaurant 14 out of 20 points.

Owner and head chef of De Moerbei is Hans de Bont. De Bont, co-owner together with his wife Maître/sommelier Anjo de Bont, opened the restaurant in about 1995.

The restaurant was originally located "Lange Voort 11 b-e" in Oegstgeest, but moved to Warmond in 2005.

See also
List of Michelin starred restaurants in the Netherlands

References 

Restaurants in the Netherlands
Michelin Guide starred restaurants in the Netherlands